It Seems Like Yesterday was a Canadian half-hour television documentary series hosted by Rick Mercer on History Television. The series focussed on news, fashion, television, motion pictures, music, trends, fads and other areas of culture from the 1950s to the early 1980s, often with humorous commentary from Rick Mercer.

The show aired between 1998 and 2001.

1990s Canadian documentary television series
1998 Canadian television series debuts
2000s Canadian documentary television series
2001 Canadian television series endings